BR Standard Class 4 may refer to;

 BR Standard Class 4 4-6-0
 BR Standard Class 4 2-6-0
 BR Standard Class 4 2-6-4T